Norbornene or norbornylene or norcamphene is a highly strained bridged cyclic hydrocarbon. It is a white solid with a pungent sour odor. The molecule consists of a cyclohexene ring with a methylene bridge between carbons 1 and 4. The molecule carries a double bond which induces significant ring strain and significant reactivity.

Production
Norbornene is made by a Diels–Alder reaction of cyclopentadiene and ethylene.  Many substituted norbornenes can be prepared similarly. Related bicyclic compounds are norbornadiene, which has the same carbon skeleton but with two double bonds, and norbornane which is prepared by hydrogenation of norbornene.

Reactions 
Norbornene undergoes an acid-catalyzed hydration reaction to form norborneol. This reaction was of great interest in the elucidation of the non-classical carbonion controversy.

Norbornene is used in the Catellani reaction and in norbornene-mediated meta-C−H activation.

Certain substituted norbornenes undergo unusual substitution reactions owing to the generation of the 2-norbornyl cation.

Polynorbornenes
Norbornenes are important monomers in ring-opening metathesis polymerizations (ROMP).  Typically these conversions are effected with ill-defined catalysts. Polynorbornenes exhibit high glass transition temperatures and high optical clarity.

In addition to ROMP, norbornene monomers also undergo vinyl-addition polymerization, and is a popular monomer for use in cyclic olefin copolymers.

Polynorbornene is used mainly in the rubber industry for antivibration (rail, building, industry), antiimpact (personal protective equipment, shoe parts, bumpers) and grip improvement (toy tires, racing tires, transmission systems, transports systems for copiers, feeders, etc.)

Ethylidene norbornene is a related monomer derived from cyclopentadiene and butadiene.

See also
Nadic anhydride

References

Monomers
Norbornanes